Highlights for Children, often referred to simply as Highlights, is an American children's magazine. It began publication in June 1946, started by Garry Cleveland Myers and his wife Caroline Clark Myers in Honesdale, Pennsylvania (the present location of its editorial office). They both worked for another children's magazine, Children's Activities, for twelve years before leaving to start Highlights. Since its inception Highlights has carried the slogan "Fun with a Purpose".

The company is now based in Columbus, Ohio, and owns book publishers Zaner-Bloser, Stenhouse Publishers, and Staff Development for Educators. Its Boyds Mills Press division was sold to Kane Press in 2019. Highlights has surpassed one billion copies in print. Highlights, High Five, and Hello magazines do not carry any third-party advertising or commercial messages.

The Highlights Foundation, in Pennsylvania, is a public, not-for-profit 501(c)(3) organization supported by individuals, several publishing companies, and writers' organizations that are committed to improving the quality of children's literature by helping authors and illustrators hone their craft. Its location is the former home of the founders of Highlights.

Before Highlights
Garry Myers earned a PhD in psychology from Columbia University before World War I, providing a basis for the teaching he would do the rest of his life. He and Caroline Myers taught illiterate soldiers for the US Army, with Caroline becoming the first female teacher employed by the Army. This experience led to their pioneering of elementary education. They taught educators and parents for a time at Case Western Reserve University in Cleveland, Ohio, during which Garry Myers wrote a nationally syndicated column entitled Parent Problems, and the couple co-authored several books.

They had become nationally well known in education and wished to share their knowledge so they began to work for Children's Activities. Lecturing across the nation, they informed, discovered, and refined what they knew. Certain business endeavors kept them from publishing what they thought was ideal for a children's magazine. Their travels also led to long discussions on what would be appropriate for children, and after finishing with Children's Activities instead of retiring they decided to start their own magazine. Their experience, knowledge and uncompromising methods led to a success for Highlights. Later, they would buy Children's Activities and incorporate it in Highlights.

Garry and Caroline Myers tragically lost their son Garry and his wife Mary along with Highlights company vice-president Cyril Ewart, who were all passengers on TWA Flight 266, which collided over New York Harbor with United Flight 826 on December 16, 1960, while the three were on the trip to discuss distribution plans for Highlights magazine. There was only one survivor on either plane, who died the following day.

Highlights
Highlights is geared mainly to elementary school students; it contains stories and puzzles for children ages six to twelve years old. One aim of the magazine is to encourage kids to read and has something for preschoolers in every issue. Highlights illustrations feature people of all colors and its stories also cover diverse communities. Its February 2017 issue included a family with two dads, the first depiction of a same-sex relationship in the magazine's 70-year history.

In June 1946, the first issue of Highlights sold fewer than 20,000 copies. Forty years later, Highlights was the most popular children's magazine in the United States, having close to two million subscribers, with 95 percent of the copies mailed to homes. The magazine accepted no advertising and eschewed single-issue sales, but could be found in most doctors' and dentists' offices in the United States.

By 1995, Highlights circulation had grown to 2.8 million, with most subscribers still being families. In 2006, the United States Postal Service delivered the one-billionth copy of Highlights magazine to a young subscriber in Dallas, Texas.

Highlights circulation numbers declined to about 2 million copies a month by 2015, and the magazine announced that it would move some content onto tablets and mobile devices with the help of San Francisco startup, Fingerprint Digital, led by former LeapFrog Enterprises executive Nancy MacIntyre. The magazine launched a new mobile app Highlights Every Day, in April 2017.

Highlights High FiveHighlights High Five is a younger children's counterpart to Highlights, first published with the January 2007 issue. This children's magazine is for preschoolers ages two through six. The goal of High Five is to help children develop and to give parent and child a fun and meaningful activity to do together each month. Every issue is 40 pages and includes poems and stories, crafts, easy recipes, games, puzzles and other activities that encourage children to be lifelong learners.

Highlights HelloHighlights Hello Magazine was introduced in December 2012. This magazine for babies and toddlers targets children ages 0–2 years old. Highlights announced that this magazine, which is offered in several subscription packages is designed specifically for babies.

Regular featuresAsk ArizonaAppearing in the magazine since 2005, "Ask Arizona" is a story series featuring a girl named Arizona who writes an advice column for other children, similar to Dear Abby or Ask Ann Landers. The article depicts real-life experiences and appears in every issue.Hidden Pictures"Hidden Pictures", published in every issue of Highlights since the magazine's inception, is now found on page 7 of each issue. Children find the smaller hidden pictures within the larger picture.Goofus and GallantFirst appearing in Highlights in 1948, Goofus and Gallant is a cartoon feature created by Garry Cleveland Myers and drawn by Leslie Harrington. The strip features two contrasting boys, Goofus and Gallant. In each cartoon, it is shown how each boy would respond to the same situation. Goofus chooses an irresponsible, immature and unkind path, while Gallant chooses a responsible, mature and kind path. Often the panels would provide a description, such as on a school bus: Goofus hogs his seat – Gallant makes space for someone else to sit down. Sometimes the situations would show the boys talking, such as phone courtesy when parents are away: Goofus: "Someone called but I forgot their name." Gallant: "Someone called for you. I wrote down their name and number". Goofus and Gallant's primary function is to teach children basic social skills. Originally drawn in black and white, Goofus and Gallant changed to colored pencils in 1994 and later changed to colored computer graphics in December 2005.The TimbertoesCreated for a 1932 book of the same name (published by The Harter Publishing Company) by writers Edna M. Aldredge and Jessie F. McKee along with illustrator John Gee, The Timbertoes has appeared in Highlights magazine for more than 75 years, the first comic appearing in 1946. The first Highlights incarnation was a full-page black and white comic strip featuring line-drawn characters, later switching to digital color in 2003. The Timbertoes family consists of parents Ma and Pa and their children Tommy and Mabel. The characters, including their dog Spot, cat Splinter, goat Butter, and horse Troy are depicted as being constructed from wood. Upon Gee's death, Highlights Senior Editor Marileta Robinson took over writing the strip, with illustrations done by Judith Hunt. Since 2003, the Timbertoes have appeared in color with Ron Zalme as the illustrator. Rich Wallace is the current writer.JokesAppearing in every issue is a series of 10 jokes of various kinds. A knock-knock joke is always included as a part of this feature.RiddlesA series of ten riddles. The punchlines appear upside-down at the bottom of the column.Create"Create" is a feature that prints drawings, poems, and stories by readers who submit them to the magazine.What's Wrong?Featured on the back cover, "What's Wrong?" is a large drawing of a typical scene of children playing, but unusual objects take the place of normal things throughout the picture. The page instructs the reader to find the various objects that are wrong.CraftsThis is a section where kids can make different crafts, such as puzzles, puppets and cards.Brain PlayThis section comprises a list of several simple questions for children.ContestsSometimes Highlights would have an illustration of something and would ask if a reader could submit a short story to accompany this. Other times it could be an unfinished story and the contest would ask if the readers could submit a few paragraphs to complete it. Several ideas would be chosen as winners and featured in a future issue.Dear Highlights"Dear Highlights" is an advice column from real children appearing at the back of each issue.Puzzles, Short Stories, and Poems'''

Every issue of Highlights features puzzles, short stories, and poems throughout the issue. A puzzle is always featured at the front side of the back cover.
About You
"About You" is a section from real children, telling about their favorite hobbies and things.

Former features

Aloysius
The Aloysius stories were written by Sydney K. Davis. They centralized on an anthropomorphic wolf named Aloysius, who would get into a situation and have to be rescued by the other characters in the story, a male named Samuel Samuel and a female named Wanda. These stories began in 1951 and appeared until 1993.

The Bear Family
This was a cartoon created by Garry Cleveland Myers. It focuses on a family of bears consisting of Father Bear, Mother Bear, daughter Woozy, and sons Poozy and Piddy. They learned about everything from name-calling to discipline.  This comic appeared from the beginning until 1989, and again from 1998 to 2012.

Your Best Self
"Your Best Self" is a one-panel comic showing kids doing the right thing that appeared until February 2015.

 Digital media 
In 2010, Highlights released a series of educational mobile apps on the iOS App Store.

In September 2015, Highlights announced a partnership with Fingerprint—a San Francisco–based startup company involved in the development of edutainment apps, in launching apps that would serve as a complement to the printed Highlights magazine, including an upcoming service that would offer daily content drawing upon the resources and back catalog of Highlights and its recurring features, and a full digital version of the magazine that will feature a "personalized" experience and integrated multimedia content. The subscription service, Highlights Every Day, officially launched in April 2016.

On June 25, 2019, Highlights for Childrens Twitter account denounced the practice of family separation at the Mexico–United States border.

 See also 
 
 

References

External links
 Official site
 "Highlights for Children 1 Billion Strong". Business First of Columbus'', June 12, 2006.

Advertising-free magazines
Children's magazines published in the United States
Honesdale, Pennsylvania
Magazines established in 1946
Magazines published in Ohio
Magazines published in Pennsylvania
Mass media in Columbus, Ohio
Monthly magazines published in the United States